Cabaret Paradis (Cabaret Paradise) is a 2006 French comedy film. The plot revolves around Shirley and Dino (Corinne and Gilles Benizio respectively), two entertainers as they purchase an old cabaret, in Paris, which they desperately try to put back on its feet.

It was released in France and Belgium on 12 April 2006.

Cast 
 Corinne Benizio as Shirley 
 Gilles Benizio as Dino 
 Michel Vuillermoz as Jeff 
 Serge Riaboukine as Wladimir
 Christian Hecq as Paco  
 Riton Liebman as Manu   
 Maaike Jansen as Pakita
 Eriq Ebouaney as The commissioner

References

External links
 

2006 films
Films set in Paris
French comedy films
2006 comedy films
2000s French films